Euphorbia gregersenii,  or Gregersen's spurge, is a plant in the family Euphorbiaceae: spurges.

Description 
This spurge is a perennial plant, herbaceous or with basically split, erected  stems. Its height is around 25–55 cm, simple or branched, soft hairy, covered with numerous, sitting, oblong leaves .  It length is about 4-4.5 cm, and about 1.2 to 2.7 cm wide. At the top is flare or slightly blunted, complete, with the upper on to the heart-shaped. The face is on all bare or sparsely hairy, and bazal leaf’s edge are soft hairy. The florescences are mostly with 4-5 rays. Bracts are ellipsoidal or ovoid oblong, naked - in length from about 2.7 to 5.3, rarely up to 6.5 cm wide and 1.2 to 2.6 (sometimes up to 3.5 cm). Brakteoles below the male flowers are anctast and integral or in 1-3-parts, yellow to lightgreen, hairy.

This spurge blossoms in May. Flowers are monoecious, in distinctive groups called  cyathitium(”cyathia”), a short bare stalk. Length is around  1.5-2.5 mm, hairy inside and flaps are just as long as the tube. The neck of pistil is in two parts.

Fruit is follicle with three yellow-green ovaries, 2.5–3 mm long. The side bare and the ridge-row have papillary cross in which the projection comprises an elongated tufts are extended at the bottom and generally accreted. The fruits are greenish or purplish splashed. The seeds are oblong-round or ovoid, 2-2.5 mm long, smooth.

Ecology and distribution
The optimal habitats of this species are the valleys of some rivers and streams in the alluvial deposits. It grows exclusively on serpentine.

This spurge is mostly Bosnian  endemic, with registered sites: Valley of Gostović,  Kamenica stream and its confluents, as well as Velež, and Borik near Borovnica and at Tajan, Zavidovići.

Locus classicus  is  Central Bosnia:  walley of Gostović streams, by Popova Luka at Maly, K. ex Beck, G. 1920.

References

Flora of Bosnia and Herzegovina
Flora of Europe
gregersenii